The Muslim Bosniak Organisation (MBO) was a political party in Bosnia and Herzegovina.

History
The party contested the 1990 general elections, receiving 1.2% of the national vote and winning two seats. In the 1996 elections it joined the "Joint List" alliance alongside the Social Democratic Party, the Union of Social Democrats, the Croatian Peasant Party and the Republican Party. The Joint List put forward Sead Avdić as its candidate for Bosniak member of the Presidency, but he finished fourth with just 0.9% of the vote. Its candidate for the Croat member, Ivo Komšić, finished second, but far behind winning candidate Krešimir Zubak. In the House of Representatives the list received 4.4% of the vote and won two seats in the Federation of Bosnia and Herzegovina and 1.3% of the vote and no seats in Republika Srpska.

The party did not contest any further elections.

References

Defunct political parties in Bosnia and Herzegovina
Political parties in Yugoslavia
Bosniak political parties in Bosnia and Herzegovina